The Parthian Empire ruled over an area roughly corresponding to present-day Iran from the third century BC to the third century AD. It contained a varying number of subordinate semi-autonomous kingdoms each with its own ruler.

Arsacids of Armenia 12–428 AD
 Vonones 12–16 (Former king of Parthia as Vonones I)
 Orodes 16–18 (Son of Artabanus III king of Parthia)
 Artaxias III 18–35 (From the house of Polemon)
 Arsaces I 35 (Son of Artabanus III king of Parthia)
 Orodes 35 (Again)
 Mithridates I 35–37 (Son of Mithridates (IV) king of Iberia)
 Orodes 37–42 (Again)
 Mithridates I 42–52 (Again)
 Rhadamistus 52–54 (Son of Pharasmanes (III) king of Iberia)
 Tiridates I 54–60 (Son of Vonones II king of Parthia & Medes)
 Tigranes VI 60–62 (From the house of Herod)
 Tiridates I 62–c. 75 (Again)
 Unknown king c. 75–89 (Probably Vologases II of Parthia)
 Sanatruces I 89–109 (Son of Vologases I of Parthia)
 Axidares (Ashkhadar) 110–113 (Son of Pacorus II king of Parthia)
 Parthamasiris (Partamasir) 113–114 (Son of Pacorus II king of Parthia)
 Roman occupation 114–115
 Mithridates II 114–116 (Brother of Sanatruces I & Osroes I king of Parthia)
 Sanatruces II 116 (Son of Mithridates II)
 Vologases I from 116 (Son of Sanatruces I)
 ?Achaemenes until 138/144
 Sohaemus 138/144–161 (Son of Achaemenes)
 Pacorus I 161–164 (Aurelius Pacorus)
 Sohaemus 164–178 (Again)
 Vologases II 178–197 
 Unknown king 197-215
 Khosrov I 215–216 (Son of Vologases II)
 Roman occupation 216-217
 Tiridates II 217–222 
 ?Khosrov (II) 222–238
 ?Tiridates (III) 238–253
 Sasanian occupation 253-279
 Hormozd-Ardashir 253-270 (Later king of Iran as Hormizd I son of Shapur I Sassanid)
 Narseh 270-293 (Later king of Iran as Narseh son of Shapur I Sassanid)
 Artavasdes VI c. 260
 Khosrov II 279–287
 Tiridates (IV) 287–298
 Tiridates III 298–330
 Pacorus II 330 (Usurper)
 Khosrov III 330–338
 Tigranes VII 338–351
 Arsaces II (Arshak II) 351–367
 Papas (Pap) 367–374
 Varasdates (Varazdat) 374–378
 Vologases III 378–386 (Co-ruler with Arsaces III (Arshak III))
 Arsaces III 378–389 (Co-ruler with Vologases III then Khosrov IV) 
 Khosrov IV 386–392 (Co-ruler with Arsaces III & then alone)
 Vramshapuh 392–414
 Khosrov IV 414–416 (Again)
 Tigranes VIII 416 co-ruler with Arsaces IV
 Arsaces IV 416 co-ruler with Tigranes VIII
 Shapur 416–420 (Later king of Iran as Shapur IV son of Yazdegerd I Sassanid)
 Artaxias IV 422–428

Arsacids of Media 144 BC – 232 AD
 Vologases (Bagasha) 144–122 BC
 Arsaces 122–111
 Artaxerxes 111–97
 Artabanus 97–88
 Mithridates 88–67
 Darius 67–65
 Mithridates 65–55
 Orodes 55–50
 Pacorus 50–38
 ?Tiridates c. 30–25
 ?Mithridates 12–9 BC
 ?Orodes c. 4–6 AD
 Artabanus 9–12 AD
 ... 
 Vonones c. 45–51
 Pacorus 51–75 son of Vonones
 ... 
 Arsaces c. 136 AD
 ?Pacorus to 163 AD
 ... 
 Vologases to 208
 ... 
 Artabanus 213–226
 Pacorus from 226 AD son of Artabanus

Arsacids of Iberia 123 BC – c. 230 AD

Arsacids of Caucasian Albania 123 BC – c .490 AD
 Vachagan I the Brave
 Vache I
 Urnayr
 Vachagan II
 Mirhavan
 Satoy
 Asay
 Aswagen
 Vache II
 Vachagan III the Pious

Arsacids of Hyrcania c. 170 BC – c. 230 AD
 Arsaces c. 165 BC son of Phraates I
 Himerus to 129 BC
 Otanes c. 70 BC
 Artabanus c. 9–40 AD
 Gotarzes 40–51 AD

Indo-Parthians c. 20 –c. 240 AD
 Indo-Parthian rulers of Sistan (Drangiana)
 Gondophares I Great king of kings, Autocrator (c. 20 BC – first years AD)
 Gondophares II Gadana Orthagnes (c. 20 AD – 30 AD?), brother of Gondophares I
 Gondophares III Sases (mid-1st century AD)
 Gondophares IV Gadana Obouzanes, son of Orthagnes
 Sanabares Great King, son of Ubouzanes
 Abdagases II King, son of Sanabares
 Pacores (late 1st century AD)
 ? Tiridates (No coins), son of Sanabares
 ? Atursasan (No coins), son of Tiridates
 Farn-Sasan, son of Atursasan

 Indo-Parthian rulers of Arachosia (Kandahar)
 Gondophares I Great king of kings, Autocrator (c. 20 BC – first years AD)
 Sarpedones Basileontos (first years AD – c. 20 AD)
 Gondophares II Gadana Orthagnes Basileontos (c. 20 AD – 30 AD?)
 Abdagases I, nephew of Gondophares I (first years AD – mid-1st century AD)
 Sarpedones Great king of kings, Dikaios, Soter, Nikiphoros
 Gondophares III Sases (mid-1st century AD)
 Sanabares Great King, Soter
 Abdagases II King
 Pacores (late 1st century AD)

 Indo-Parthian rulers of Jammu
 Gondophares I (c. 20 BC – first years AD)
 Abdagases I (first years AD – mid-1st century AD)
 Sarpedones 
 Gondophares III Sases (mid-1st century AD)
 Gondophares IV Gadana Obouzanes
 Gondophares III Sases (mid-1st century AD)

 Indo-Parthian rulers of Indus shore (Balochistan)
 Sarpedones 
 Satavastra
 Gondophares III Sases (mid-1st century AD)

 Indo-Parthian rulers of Gandhara
 Gondophares I (c. 20 BC – first years AD)
 Abdagases I Basileontos (first years AD – mid-1st century AD)
 Abdagases I Great king, king of kings (first years AD – mid-1st century AD)
 Gondophares III Sases (mid-1st century AD)

 Indo-Parthian rulers of Taxila
 Abdagases I (first years AD – mid-1st century AD)
 Gondophares III Sases (mid-1st century AD)

 Indo-Parthian rulers of North Arachosia (Bagram)
 Gondophares I Great king of kings, Autocrator, Soter (c. 20 BC – first years AD)
 Abdagases I Great king, Soter (first years AD – mid-1st century AD)

Kings of Merv & Abarshahr c. 10–c. 250 AD
 ?             cont. with Phraates V
 ?             cont. with Artabanus II
 ?             cont. with Gotarzes II and Vardanes I
 D ...        c. 50 AD
 Po ...       cont. with Vologases I
 Sanabares c. 2nd half of the 1st century AD
 Pacores c. 100 AD
 ?             cont. with Vologases III and Mithridates IV
 ?             cont. with Vologases III and Mithridates IV
 Tiren cont. with Vologases IV
 ?             cont. with Vologases IV
 Ardashir c. 200 AD
 ?             1st half of the 3rd century
 ?             1st half of the 3rd century
 ?             c. 250 AD

Kings of Persis c. 230 BC – c. 210 AD

Rulers of Hatra  
In inscriptions found at Hatra, several rulers are mentioned. Other rulers are sporadically mentioned by classical authors. They appear with two titles. The earlier rulers are called mry''' (translation uncertain, perhaps administrator), the later ones mlk -king''.

Kings of Elymais c. 147 BC – c. 224 AD 

 Kamnaskires I Soter (c. 147 BC?)
 Kamnaskires II Nikephoros (c 145–c. 139 BC)
 Okkonapses (c. 139/138–c. 137 BC), rebel
 Tigraios (c. 137–c. 132 bc), rebel
 Darius Soter (c. 129 BC), rebel
 Pittit (125–124 BC), rebel
 Kamnaskires III (c. 82–62/61 BC), co-ruler with Anzaze
 Anzaze (c. 82–62/61 BC), co-ruler with Kamnaskires III
 Kamnaskires IV (1st century BC)
 Kamnaskires V (1st century BC)
 Kamnaskires VI (1st century AD)
 Orodes I (1st century)
 Orodes II, also known as Kamnaskires-Orodes (1st/2nd century)
 Phraates (1st/2nd century)
 Osroes (2nd century)
 Orodes III (2nd century), co-ruler with Ulfan
 Ulfan (2nd century), co-ruler with Orodes III
 Abar-Basi (2nd century)
 Orodes IV (2nd/3rd century)
 Khwasak (3rd century)
 Orodes V (3rd century)

Kings of Characene c. 170 BC–c. 222 AD
 Hyspaosines c. 127–122/121 BC
 Apodakos c. 110/109-104/103 BC
 Tiraios I 95/94-90/89 BC
 Tiraios II 79/78-49/48 BC
 Artabazos 49/48-48/47 BC
 Attambelos I 47/46-25/24 BC
 Theonesios I c. 19/18 BC
 Attambalos II c. 17/16 BC - AD 8/9
 Abinergaos I 10/11; 22/23
 Orabazes I c. 19
 Attambalos III c. 37/38-44/45
 Theonesios II c. 46/47
 Theonesios III c. 52/53
 Attambalos IV 54/55-64/65
 Attambalos V 64/65-73/74
 Orabazes II c. 73-80
 Pakoros (II) 80-101/02 king of Iran
 Attambalos VI c. 101/02-105/06
 Theonesios IV c. 110/11-112/113
 Attambalos VII 113/14-117
 Meredates c. 131-150/51 son of Pakoros (II) king of Iran
 Orabazes III c. 150/151-165
 Abinergaios II (?) c. 165-180
 Attambalos VIII c. 180-195 (?)
 Maga (?) c. 195-210
 Abinergaos III c. 210-222

Kings of Osrhoene 132 BC–c. 293 AD
 Aryu (132–127 BC)
 Abdu bar Maz'ur (127–120 BC)
 Fradhasht bar Gebar'u (120–115 BC)
 Bakru I bar Fradhasht (115–112 BC)
 Bakru II bar Bakru (112–94 BC)
 Ma'nu I (94 BC)
 Abgar I Piqa (94–68 BC)
 Abgar II bar Abgar (68–52 BC)
 Ma'nu II (52–34 BC)
 Paqor (34–29 BC)
 Abgar III (29–26 BC)
 Abgar IV Sumaqa (26–23 BC)
 Ma'nu III Saphul (23–4 BC)
 Abgar V Ukkama bar Ma'nu (Abgarus of Edessa) (4 BC–7 AD)
 Ma'nu IV bar Ma'nu (7–13 AD)
 Abgar V Ukkama bar Ma'nu (13–50)
 Ma'nu V bar Abgar (50–57)
 Ma'nu VI bar Abgar (57–71)
 Abgar VI bar Ma'nu (71–91)
 Sanatruk (91–109)
 Abgar VII bar Ezad (109–116)
 Roman interregnum 116–118
 Yalur (118–122, co-ruler with Parthamaspates)
 Parthamaspates (118–123)
 Ma'nu VII bar Ezad (123–139)
 Ma'nu VIII bar Ma'nu (139–163)
 Wa'il bar Sahru (163–165)
 Ma'nu VIII bar Ma'nu (165–167)
 Abgar VIII (167–177)
 Abgar IX (the great) (177–212)
 Abgar X Severus bar Ma'nu (212–214)
 Abgar (X) Severus Bar Abgar (IX) Rabo (214–216)
 Ma’nu (IX) Bar Abgar (X) Severus (216–242)
 Abgar (XI) Farhat Bar Ma’nu (IX) (242–244)

Kings of Adiabene c. 69 BC – c. 310 AD

 Abdissares (c. 164 BC)
 Unknown king (c. 69 BC)
 Artaxares (cont. with Augustus)
 Izates I (c. 15 AD)
 Bazeus Monobazus I (20?–30?)
 Heleni (c. 30–58)
 Izates II bar Monobazus (c. 34–58)
 Vologases (Parthian occupation opposing Izates II) (c. 50)
 Monobazus II bar Monobazus (58 – middle of the 70s)
 Meharaspes (?–116)
 To the Roman Empire (116–117)
 Atwr ('tlw) (c. 150)
 To the Sassanid Empire 
 Ardashir II (344–376)

Kings of Korduene c. 140 BC – c. 359 AD
 Zarbienus; early mid-1st century BC until c. 69 BC. Killed by Tigranes II.
 Manisarus; ~ 115 AD: He took control over parts of Armenia and Mesopotamia, in the time of Trajan. 
 Ardashir; ~ 340s AD: He was against the Christianization of Corduene.
 Jovinian ~ 359 AD

Notes and references

Bibliography

 Baratin, Charlotte, "Les provinces orientales de l’empire parthe", Thèse de doctorat en Langues, histoire et civilisations des mondes anciens, Université Lumière Lyon2, 2009, V. Entre Parthes et Kushans.
 Fröhlich, C. Indo-Parthian Dynasty. Encyclopædia Iranica, Vol. Xiii, Fasc. 1: 100–103, 2004.
 Josephus Flavius, Antiquities of the Jews.
 Pakzadian, Hasan. "The Coins of Elymais", Tehran, 2007. (in Persian)
 Qashqai, Hamidreza, "The successors of Mithridates II", Bulletin of Ancient Iranian History (UCLA), vol. 5, March 2009.(in Persian)
 Qashqai, Hamidreza. "Indo-Parthian descendants in the Sasanian era", 2017.
 The Cambridge History of Iran (CHI), vol. 3(I), THE SELEUCID, PARTHIAN AND SASANIAN PERIODS, Cambridge University Press, 1983.
 The Cambridge History of Iran (CHI), vol. 3(II), THE SELEUCID, PARTHIAN AND SASANIAN PERIODS, Cambridge University Press, 1983.
 Wiesehöfer, Josef, "ANCIENT PERSIA from 550 BC to 650 AD", tr. by Azizeh Azodi, I.B.Tauris Publishers, London, 1996.
 www.parthia.com

Iran history-related lists
Persia

1st-century BC rulers in Asia
1st-century BC rulers in Europe
Vassal rulers of the Parthian Empire